R road may refer to:
 Ring roads in Belgium
 R roads in the Czech Republic - expressways
 Regional roads in Ireland
 R roads in Malaysia, roads in Perlis 
 Regional roads in Senegal
 R roads in Slovakia are "Rýchlostná cesta" (expressways)
 Regional Routes in South Africa, designated with letter R
 Provincial Routes in South Africa, also designated with letter R
 Corridor R, a highway in the U.S. state of Kentucky